KLOH (1050 AM) is a radio station broadcasting a country music format serving Pipestone, Minnesota, with rimshot coverage in the Sioux Falls, South Dakota area. The station is currently owned by Collin Christensen and Carmen Christensen, through licensee Christensen Broadcasting, LLC.

Programming
KLOH is the exclusive home for Pipestone Area High School sports. Bill VanHoecke and Lance Oye cover Arrow football, volleyball, boys' and girls' basketball, baseball, and softball. KLOH is also a University of Minnesota Golden Gophers affiliate covering football, basketball, and hockey.

References

External links
KLOH website

Country radio stations in the United States
Radio stations in Minnesota
Radio stations established in 1955
1955 establishments in Minnesota